Andrew Noel Griffiths (born 3 September 1961) is an Australian children's book author and comedy writer and was educated at Yarra Valley Grammar School. He is most notable for his Just! series, which was adapted into an animated television series called What's with Andy?, his novel The Day My Bum Went Psycho, which was also adapted into a television series, and the Treehouse series, which has been adapted into several stage plays. Previously a vocalist with alternative rock bands Gothic Farmyard and Ivory Coast, in 1992 he turned to writing. He is well known for working with Terry Denton. Griffiths is noted as a supporter of children against what he views as "cotton wool" childhoods, and, along with Denton, was a noted supporter of the September 2019 climate strikes.

Bibliography

Short story collections

"Just!" series

Bad book series
 The Bad Book (2004)
 The Very Bad Book (2010)

Novels

"Treehouse" series

 The 13-Storey Treehouse (1 Sep 2011)
 The 26-Storey Treehouse (1 Sep 2012)
 The 39-Storey Treehouse (1 Sep 2013)
 The 52-Storey Treehouse (1 Sep 2014)
 The 65-Storey Treehouse (12 Aug 2015)
 The 78-Storey Treehouse (9 Aug 2016)
 The 91-Storey Treehouse (8 Aug 2017)
 The 104-Storey Treehouse (10 Jul 2018)
 The 117-Storey Treehouse (23 Jul 2019)
 The 130-Storey Treehouse (6 Apr 2021)
 The 143-Storey Treehouse (5 Apr 2022)

"Treehouse" spin-offs
 The Treehouse Fun Book (activity book) (22 Mar 2016)
 The Treehouse Fun Book 2 (activity book) (28 Mar 2017)
 The Treehouse Fun Book 3 (activity book) (27 Mar 2018)
 Terry's Dumb Dot Story: A Treehouse Tale (World Book Day (UK and Ireland) 2018 special) (27 Feb 2018)
 The Treehouse Joke Book (24 Sep 2019)

"Bum" series
 The Day My Bum Went Psycho  (2001), published in the US as The Day My Butt Went Psycho
 Zombie Bums from Uranus (2003), published in the US as Zombie Butts From Uranus
 Bumageddon: The Final Pongflict (2005) published in the US as Butt Wars: The Final Conflict

"A&T's World of Stupidity" series
 What Bumosaur is That? (2007), published in the US as What Buttosaur is That?
 What Body Part is That? (2011)

"Schooling Around" series
 Treasure Fever! (2008)
 Pencil of Doom! (2008)
 Mascot Madness! (2008)
 Robot Riot! (2009)

Picture books
 Stinky Stories, illustrated by Jeff Raglus
 Fast Food and No Play Make Jack a Fat Boy (2006)
 The Cat on the Mat Is Flat (2006)
 The Big Fat Cow That Goes KAPOW! (2008)
 The Naked Boy and the Crocodile (2011)
 Andypedia (2012)
 Once Upon a Slime (2013)
 The Cat, the Rat, and the Baseball Bat (2013)
 Ed and Ted and Ted’s Dog Fred (2014)

References

External links

 Official website
 Griffiths profile on Macmillan.com
 Andy Griffiths discusses career and writing technique with Anna Burkey at State Library Victoria – ABC Splash
 
 

1961 births
Living people
Australian comedy writers
Australian children's writers
Monash University alumni
Deakin University alumni
Victoria University, Melbourne alumni
Australian male novelists
Writers from Melbourne